Rodolfo y Su Tipica was a Colombian Cumbia act, fronted by Rodolfo Aicardi (1946 - 2007), who had issues released by Discos Fuentes record label.

Prominent hits
 "Tabaco y Ron" (1979)
 "La Colegiala" (1980), a cover of the omonym song by Peruvian combo Los Ilusionistas.

Use in television advertising
In 1981, Nescafé used Rodolfo's "La Colegiala" in a French commercial for its Alta Rica brand. The commercial was credited with increasing sales by 60% and paving the way for the band's successful European tour.

References

Colombian cumbia musical groups